The women's team was an archery event held as part of the Archery at the 2000 Summer Olympics programme.

Results
The ranking for the women's teams was determined by summing the ranking round scores of the three members.

Knockout stage

References

External links
 Official Olympic Report
 

Archery at the 2000 Summer Olympics
2000 in women's archery
Women's events at the 2000 Summer Olympics